Mamazulunov (Cyrillic Uzbek and Russian Мамазулунов) is a surname. Notable people with the surname include:

 Oybek Mamazulunov, Uzbekistani boxer
 Sher Mamazulunov (born 1995), Uzbekistani kickboxer

Uzbek-language surnames
Russian-language surnames